Aeroflex–Andover Airport  is a public-use airport located two nautical miles (3.704 km) north of Andover within Kittatinny Valley State Park in Sussex County, New Jersey, United States. The airport is publicly owned by the New Jersey Forest Fire Service and used as a base for aerial wildfire suppression.

Facilities and aircraft 
It has one runway designated 03/21 with an asphalt surface measuring 1,981 by 50 feet (604 x 15 m).

For the 12-month period ending January 1, 2010, the airport had 24,826 aircraft operations, an average of 68 per day: 100% general aviation. At that time there were 48 aircraft based at this airport: 98% single-engine and 2% helicopter.

Runway issues

Pilots consider landing on the short runway challenging, particularly for those who do not regularly use the airport. With large lakes on either end, it has been likened to an aircraft carrier. While Flying editor Stephen Pope, who lives in northern New Jersey, considers that reputation to be exaggerated, "it wouldn't be my first choice if I had to divert with my family on board."

Pope was referring to one of two recent incidents where landing planes had come in too fast and gone off the runway into the water. In that July 5, 2019, accident, the pilot of a Cessna C172 who had left Harrisburg, Pennsylvania, with his wife and children aboard was forced to divert when Morristown Municipal Airport, his intended destination, was temporarily closed so that President Donald Trump and his wife could go to the resort he owns in nearby Bedminster and play golf. None of them were injured.

After complaining of neck and chest pains, and having been exposed to cold water, he was airlifted to Morristown Memorial Hospital for treatment.

See also
 Coyle Field
 Strawberry Field (airport)

References

External links
 

 New Jersey Forest Fire Service

Airports in New Jersey
Transportation buildings and structures in Sussex County, New Jersey
New Jersey Forest Fire Service